Senator Castle may refer to:

James Castle (politician) (1836–1903), Minnesota State Senate
Mike Castle (born 1939), Delaware State Senate
Miles B. Castle (1826–1900), Illinois State Senate